The Aachen Open Air Pop Festival was a rock festival held at Hauptstadion in Aachen, Germany, on 10–12 July 1970. The "Soersfestival", as it is commonly called, was the initiative of three local students: Golo Goldschmitt, Walter Reiff, and Karl-August Hohmann in particular. As there were many hippies and freaks to be expected from all over Europe, the organisers had to tackle considerable difficulties and hostilities to crack on with the idea. Some 30.-40,000 visitors attended. The Festival was well-organised, the weather was fine and no real problems occurred in spite of a massive and intimidating cop presence. Coca-Cola was the main investor, along with some local entrepreneurs. Tickets cost DM 15,- , or DM 40,- for three days. Artists who ultimately declined invitations, included  Ginger Baker's Air Force, Canned Heat, Donovan, Fat Mattress, John Lennon & the Plastic Ono Band, John Mayall, Rhinoceros, The Rolling Stones and Soft Machine.

Acts
Friday, July 10:

Traffic (advertised, but did not appear)
Deep Purple
Free
If
Quintessence
Livin' Blues
Principal Edwards Magic Theatre
Cuby + Blizzards (advertised, but did not appear)
Golden Earring
Spencer Davis & Alun Davies 

Saturday, July 11:

Edgar Broughton Band
Taste
Keef Hartley
Caravan
Can
Kevin Ayers and the Whole World
Mungo Jerry
Kraftwerk

Sunday, July 12:

Pink Floyd
Fairport Convention (advertised, but did not appear)
Van der Graaf Generator (cancelled for finishing time)
Hardin & York
Amon Düül II
Tyrannosaurus Rex
Krokodil 
Raw Material 
Champion Jack Dupree

See also
List of historic rock festivals
List of music festivals

References

External links 
 Kraftwerk Aspekte Aachen 1970
 Amon Düül II Eye Shaking King 1970

Rock festivals in Germany
1970 in music
Aachen 
1970 in West Germany
Pop music festivals
Counterculture festivals
1970 music festivals